Syneura is a genus of flies in the family Phoridae.

Species
S. cocciphila (Coquillett, 1895)
S. digitalis Borgmeier, 1925
S. diversicolor Borgmeier, 1923
S. edwardsi Schmitz, 1929
S. furcellata Borgmeier, 1924
S. infraposita Borgmeier & Schmitz, 1923
S. longipennis Borgmeier, 1935
S. luciola Borgmeier, 1925
S. semifurcata Prado, 1976
S. subsetosa Borgmeier, 1971
S. williamsi Borgmeier, 1971

References

Phoridae
Platypezoidea genera
Taxa named by Charles Thomas Brues